Gulov or Gulova is a surname. Notable people with the surname include:
Alisher Gulov (born 1989), Tajikistani taekwondo practitioner
Leonid Gulov (born 1981), Estonian rower